The Sikh Coalition is a Sikh-American advocacy group that defends Sikh civil rights founded in 2001 with offices in New York City, Washington, D.C., and Fremont, California.

The Sikh Coalition, was originally named the Coalition of Sikh Organizations of New York. Sikh-Americans were attacked as a "retribution attack" after 9/11, thus leading to the founding of the group, at a time when the American public "began to equate the turban and beard with the face of terror."

Background
The Sikh Coalition was formed on the night of September 11, 2001, by volunteers in reaction to a wave of aggressive attacks against Sikh Americans throughout the United States. It is now the largest Sikh Civil Rights organization. Its community-based group seeking to promote equal and human justice for all citizens.

COVID-19

The Sikh Coalition helped 500,000 Sikhs living in America understand the pandemic better.

Youth
The Sikh Coalition established the Junior Sikh Coalition on August 2012 to empower the youth and to create a safe environment for them to practice Sikh. It is a "student-led initiative designed to inspire Sikh youth, strengthen the communities to which they belong, and help them achieve their leadership potential". The program offers 1-year leadership training to high school and college students. The program is currently on pause due to the worldwide COVID-19.

See also
 The New York Foundation
 Sikh American Legal Defense and Education Fund
 Sikhs for Justice

References

External links

 Official website
 Khalsa Kids
 Sikh Research Institute
 Ensaaf

Political advocacy groups in the United States
Legal advocacy organizations in the United States
Sikhism in the United States
Sikhism in New York (state)
Sikh organisations
Organizations established in 2001
Anti-racist organizations in the United States